Dombay is the name of several inhabited localities in Russia.

Urban localities
Dombay, Karachay-Cherkess Republic, a resort settlement under the administrative jurisdiction of the city of republic significance of Karachayevsk, Karachay-Cherkess Republic

Rural localities
Dombay, Omsk Oblast, an aul in Moskalensky Rural Okrug of Maryanovsky District of Omsk Oblast